KUPH is a radio station airing a Top 40 (CHR) format licensed to Mountain View, Missouri, broadcasting on 96.9 MHz FM.  The station is owned by Central Ozark Radio Network, Inc.

References

External links

Contemporary hit radio stations in the United States
UPH